The Parliament of Bats was a Parliament of England that was held in 1426 in Leicester.  Meetings took place in the great hall of Leicester Castle.  The King at the time, Henry VI, was an infant, and the session saw him knighted in St Mary de Castro Church across the road from the Castle Great Hall.

The parliament is so-called because members and their attendants were not allowed to carry swords by the Duke of Gloucester, and so armed themselves with clubs, or bats—tensions being high because of the ongoing dispute between Cardinal Beaufort, the Bishop of Winchester and off-and-on Lord Chancellor, and the Duke of Gloucester, the King's uncle and regent.  The Parliament saw Beaufort removed permanently as Lord Chancellor and replaced with John Kemp.

See also
 Regency government, 1422–1437

References

History of Leicester
15th-century English parliaments
1426 establishments in England
1426 in England